Fast oil recovery (FOR) is a term comprising various innovative systems which can be built into a new ship or integrated into an old ship, thus facilitating efficient and safe removal of an oil spill from a wrecked vessel. The drastic consequences resulting from an oil spill, especially damages to marine life, has resulted in an increased demand for ships more prepared to respond to a possible oil accident. There are about 50 million ships in North America, and c. 1% leak oil into the waters.

Ships that do not leak oil into the ship's bilge water have installed fast oil recovery systems (FORS), with the goal of eliminating all oil-contaminated bilge water. Their systems remove 99.9% of the oil in a vessel's bilge, saving thousands of dollars. Such systems are used instead of absorbent pads and filters due to the latter being messier, more expensive, and requiring high maintenance. Many companies like JLMD and Blue Water have started making these systems to help the environment.

Research has shown that during wreckages, groundings, and other crisis situations, the oil, trapped in the ship, requires complex procedures and technologies for recovery. Ship-owners, shipping authorities, salvage companies, and others can experience difficulties reaching the tanks to pump out the remaining pollutants on board. The weaknesses of current procedures and the lack of equipment on board of the ship is often apparent in such endeavors.

References

External links
https://archive.today/20130216013045/http://www.fastoilrecovery.com/home.html
https://web.archive.org/web/20131105183425/http://www.bwesglobal.com/oilrecovery.htm

Oil spill remediation technologies